Metachanda trixantha is a moth species in the oecophorine tribe Metachandini. It was described by Edward Meyrick in 1911. Its type locality is Silhouette Island, Seychelles.

References

Oecophorinae
Moths described in 1911
Taxa named by Edward Meyrick
Moths of Seychelles